Yusbelys Parra (born 31 July 1986 in El Vigía) is a Venezuelan women's javelin thrower.

Competition record

References

Venezuelan female javelin throwers
1986 births
Living people
Athletes (track and field) at the 2011 Pan American Games
Athletes (track and field) at the 2012 Summer Olympics
South American Games silver medalists for Venezuela
South American Games medalists in athletics
Competitors at the 2006 South American Games
Olympic athletes of Venezuela
Pan American Games competitors for Venezuela
20th-century Venezuelan women
21st-century Venezuelan women